Jimmy Connors defeated Phil Dent in the final, 7–6(9–7), 6–4, 4–6, 6–3 to win the men's singles tennis title at the 1974 Australian Open. For the first time in the Open Era, none of the semifinalists at a major had previously won a major title.

John Newcombe was the defending champion, but lost in the quarterfinals to Ross Case.

Björn Borg competed in the Australian Open this year for the first and only time in his career. He lost to Dent in the third round. The format was the same as the previous year with the first round as best-of-3-sets and the rest of the tournament best-of-5-sets.

Seeds
The seeded players are listed below. Jimmy Connors is the champion; others show the round in which they were eliminated.

  John Newcombe (quarterfinals)
  Jimmy Connors (champion)
  John Alexander (semifinals)
  Björn Borg (third round)
  Karl Meiler (second round)
  Colin Dibley (quarterfinals)
  Onny Parun (third round)
  Ross Case (semifinals)
  Phil Dent (final)
  Dick Crealy (third round)
  Geoff Masters (first round)
  Allan Stone (third round)
  Bob Giltinan (quarterfinals)
  Barry Phillips-Moore (third round)
  Bob Carmichael (first round)
  John Cooper (first round)

Draw

Final eight

Section 1

Section 2

Section 3

Section 4

External links
 Association of Tennis Professionals (ATP) – 1974 Australian Open Men's Singles draw
 1974 Australian Open – Men's draws and results at the International Tennis Federation

Mens singles
Australian Open (tennis) by year – Men's singles